The Half Moon Hotel in Coney Island, Brooklyn, New York, was a 225-foot-tall, 14-story hotel that opened on May 5, 1927, on the Riegelmann Boardwalk at West 29th Street. The Half Moon was built to help Coney Island compete with the beach resort Atlantic City, New Jersey. The hotel was designed by the architectural firm of George B. Post and Sons and built by the Cauldwell-Wingate Co.

It is best known as the location where Abe Reles, informant for the FBI who brought down numerous members of Murder, Inc., either jumped, fell or was pushed to his death on November 12, 1941, from room 623, where he was in protective custody of the New York City Police Department, a few hours before he was scheduled to testify against Albert Anastasia. Reles's death signified the reach that organized crime had into the police department – he was guarded by six police detectives. There was little doubt that Reles was defenestrated.

The name "Half Moon" refers to the name of explorer Henry Hudson's ship, which anchored off Gravesend Bay in Brooklyn (the location of Coney Island), while searching for a short cut to Asia.

During World War 2, the hotel was operated by the U.S. Navy and became known as the "U. S. Naval Special Hospital Sea Gate, NY", a convalescent hospital.

In the 1950s, it became a senior citizens' home called the Metropolitan Jewish Geriatric Center. They moved to another building and it was demolished in 1995. Today the Seagate Rehabilitation and Nursing Center is on the site.

References

Buildings and structures demolished in 1995
Coney Island
Demolished buildings and structures in Brooklyn
Demolished hotels in New York City
Hotel buildings completed in 1927
Hotels established in 1927
Hotels in Brooklyn
Skyscraper hotels in New York City
Skyscrapers in Brooklyn